Baron Avro Manhattan (April 6, 1914 – November 27, 1990) was an Italian writer, historian, poet and artist. An born aristocrat who wrote about various political topics throughout his career, Manhattan is perhaps best remembered as the author of several works discussing the Vatican's role in world politics and global affairs. Manhattan attended both the Sorbonne and the London School of Economics.

Life and career
Born in Milan, Italy, on April 6, 1914, to American and Swiss/Dutch parents of Jewish extraction, Manhattan was originally known asTeofilo Lucifero Gardini in his early days in Italy. Before his exile, Manhattan was known to spend his summers at the home of the artist, Paolo Troubetzkoy, in Verbania.

Manhattan, himself a painter, exhibited a number of his works at local Italian museums. The last of these exhibitions was at the Museo del Paesaggio, in Verbania, where two of his paintings remain to this day.

Manhattan was exiled to England from Italy during the Second Italo-Ethiopian War. During World War II, he operated a radio station called "Radio Freedom" broadcasting to nations occupied by the Axis Powers.  Manhattan officially changed residence to the United Kingdom in 1945 for "political reasons," but not until 1953 did Manhattan legally change his name, relinquishing the names "Teofilo Angelo Mario Gardini" and "Teophile Lucifer Gardini." At the time, he lived in Wimbledon, London.

In 1961, Manhattan met his future wife, Anne Manhattan née Cunningham Brown, in London, and two years later, they moved into a house on Henry Nelson Street in South Shields, North East England.

He is buried with his wife at Shotley Bridge in Benfieldside Cemetery, Consett, County Durham, England. Their gravestone reads:

His friends included H. G. Wells, Pablo Picasso, George Bernard Shaw, and scientist Marie Stopes.

Works
The following is a list of Avro Manhattan's most notable books, ordered chronologically:

The Rumbling of the Apocalypse (1934)
Towards the New Italy (Preface by H.G. Wells, 1943)
Latin America and the Vatican (1946)
The Catholic Church Against the Twentieth Century (1947; 2nd ed. 1950)
The Vatican in Asia (1948)
Religion in Russia (1949)
The Vatican in World Politics (1949)
Catholic Imperialism and World Freedom (1952; 2nd ed. 1959)
Terror Over Yugoslavia: The Threat to Europe (1953)
The Dollar and the Vatican (1956)
Vatican Imperialism in the Twentieth Century  (1965)
Catholic Terror Today (1969)
Religious Terror in Ireland (1974)
Catholic Power Today (1967)
The Vatican-Moscow-Washington Alliance (1982)
The Vatican Billions (1983)
Vietnam... Why Did We Go? The Shocking Story of the Catholic "Church's" Role in Starting the Vietnam War (1984)
Murder in the Vatican: American, Russian, and Papal Plots (1985)
The Vatican’s Holocaust (1986)
The Dollar and the Vatican (1988)
Catholic Terror in Ireland  (1988)

See also
 Viktor Novak
 Edmond Paris
 Djoko Slijepčević
 Branko Bokun

References

External links
Avro Manhattan at Online Books Page

Secrets & Lies: The Life of Baron Avro Manhattan (Documentary). 2018.

1914 births
1990 deaths
Italian male writers
Alumni of the London School of Economics
University of Paris alumni
Italian people of American descent
Writers from Milan
Critics of the Catholic Church
Italian people of Dutch-Jewish descent
Italian people of Swiss-Jewish descent
Italian emigrants to the United Kingdom
People from Shotley Bridge